The 1973 Cincinnati Bengals season was the franchise's 4th season in the National Football League, and the 6th overall.

The Bengals split their first eight games, then swept their last six to win their second AFC Central Division title. 
Cincinnati for the second time made the playoffs, losing to the eventual Super Bowl winner (Miami 34–16) for the second time as well.

RB Essex Johnson became the first Bengal to achieve 100+ yards rushing and receiving in the same game. He rushed for 121 yards on 21 carries and got 116 yards on two receptions on Sep 30, 1973 at San Diego. Perhaps one of the best marks of the season for the Bengals was giving the eventual NFC Champion Vikings their most lopsided loss of the season 27-0.

Offseason

NFL Draft

Personnel

Staff

Roster

Regular season

Schedule

Note: Intra-division opponents are in bold text.

Game summaries

Week 2

Week 5 vs Steelers

Week 7 at Steelers

Standings

Team stats

Team leaders
Passing: Ken Anderson (329 Att, 179 Comp, 2428 Yds, 54.4 Pct, 18 TD, 12 Int, 81.2 Rating) 
Rushing: Essex Johnson (195 Att, 997 Yds, 5.1 Avg, 46 Long, 4 TD) 
Receiving: Isaac Curtis (45 Rec, 843 Yds, 18.7 Avg, 77 Long, 9 TD) 
Scoring: Horst Muhlmann, 94 points (21 FG; 31 PAT)

Postseason

Awards and records
RB Boobie Clark (AFC Rookie of the Year)
WR Isaac Curtis, Led AFC Rookies, Receiving Yards, 843 yards

Pro Bowl Selections
WR Isaac Curtis 
DT Mike Reid
TE Bob Trumpy

References

 Bengals on Pro Football Reference
 Bengals Schedule on jt-sw.com
 Bengals History on Official Site

Cincinnati Bengals
Cincinnati Bengals seasons
AFC Central championship seasons
Cincinnati